Sir Frederick Wigan, 1st Baronet, J.P., D.L (4 October 1827 – 2 March 1907) of Clare Lawn in Mortlake, Surrey and of Purland Chase in Ross, Herefordshire, was a merchant based at Southwark, in Surrey, near the south end of London Bridge.

He was born in East Malling, the son of a hop merchant. He was appointed High Sheriff of Surrey in 1894, and knighted that year. In 1898 he became a baronet. He was the first Treasurer of Southwark Cathedral. The  Hop Exchange at No. 24 Southwark Street served as the centre for hop trading for the brewing industry. His mural monument with sculpted bust survives in Southwark Cathedral.

Footnotes

References
Obituary, The Times, 4 March 1933

1827 births
1907 deaths
Knights Bachelor
Baronets in the Baronetage of the United Kingdom
Deputy Lieutenants of Surrey
19th-century English businesspeople